Tania Calvo Barbero (born 16 June 1992) is a Spanish professional racing cyclist, who currently rides for UCI Women's Continental Team . She rode at the 2015 UCI Track Cycling World Championships.

Major results

2013
 Copa Internacional de Pista
1st Sprint
1st Team Sprint (with Helena Casas)
 UEC European U23 Track Championships
2nd Sprint
3rd 500m Time Trial
2014
 1st Sprint, Öschelbronn
 2nd Sprint, UEC European Track Championships
 2nd Keirin, Singen
 2nd Sprint, Oberhausen
 3rd Sprint, UEC European U23 Track Championships
2015
 1st Sprint, 6 giorni delle rose - Fiorenzuola
 1st Keirin, Irish International Track GP
 Trofeu Ciutat de Barcelona
1st Keirin
1st Sprint
 Grand Prix of Poland
2nd Keirin
2nd Sprint
 3rd Sprint, Revolution – Round 1, Derby
2016
 Trofeu Ciutat de Barcelona
1st Keirin
1st Sprint
 Trofeu CAR Anadia Portugal
1st Sprint
1st 500m Tim Trial
 6 giorni delle rose - Fiorenzuola
2nd Sprint
3rd Keirin
2017
 TROFEU CIUTAT DE BARCELONA-Memorial Miquel Poblet 
3rd Keirin
3rd Sprint

References

External links
 

1992 births
Living people
Spanish female cyclists
Olympic cyclists of Spain
Cyclists at the 2016 Summer Olympics
Cyclists at the 2019 European Games
European Games competitors for Spain
Spanish track cyclists
Sportspeople from Vitoria-Gasteiz
Cyclists from the Basque Country (autonomous community)